Farmington is an unincorporated community in Belmont County, in the U.S. state of Ohio.

History
Farmington was laid out in 1818. A former variant name of Farmington was Cope. A post office called Cope was established in 1874, and remained in operation until 1895.

References

Unincorporated communities in Belmont County, Ohio
1818 establishments in Ohio
Populated places established in 1818
Unincorporated communities in Ohio